Glory Entertainment (also known as The Association of Tehran Young Voice Actors) is an Iranian institute specializing in dubbing movies and primarily animated films and cartoons for the Persian-speaking audience. The association began operating officially on December 6, 2005, after acquiring official license and permit from the Ministry of Labour and Social Affairs and the Ministry of Culture and Islamic Guidance with the goal of entrepreneurship, rendering high-quality content, improving the quality of Iran's dubbing system using state-of-the-art technology and meeting universal criteria in the field. Glory Entertainment has recruited over 380 voice actors and has launched 10 digital recording studios.

The association increased its range of activities since by dubbing works commissioned by the IRIB, local home-video companies, directors, local and foreign animation producers, the UN and Radio Javan. The association has received different awards from IRIB TV5, the 16th Festival of the Capital Cities of Iran's Provinces' TV-Radio Products and the UN - WFP.

Notable works dubbed by the association include the works of Walt Disney, Pixar, DreamWorks and studios alike.

The association's further activities include publishing the first dubbing periodical called The Dubbing in Iran which provided information on the topic. The association is now publishing the first professional dubbing magazine called Sedapisheh. In 2012, Glory Entertainment started an Internet radio station by the name of Voice of Glory which streams children's stories 24/7.

History 
This association first began working with name «Glory Entertainment» and in 2003 and after registration in 2005 increased activity range and cooperated with broadcasting different channels, media institutions with license of Ministry of Culture and Guidance, directors and Iranian and foreign animation producers, United Nations, Radio Javan and... . And won certficate of appreciation From IRIB 5 channel and letter of commendation from United Nations (World Food Project).

Other activities 
From Association of Tehran Young Voice Actors other works, is releasing Dubbing specialized publication with name dubbing. Also this association released voice actor publication since March 2012. Furthermore first Iranian children stories website and «Glorytoon» website for preparing dubbed works in June 2014 by this association.

Dubbed works 
YaghenAli's adventures

Winx Club: The Mystery of the Abyss

Encanto

Luca

Frozen

Shrek the ghost of Lord Farquaad

Shrek (movie)

Shrek 2

Shrek the Third

Shrek Forever After

Hotel Transylvania

Hotel Transylvania 2

Hotel Transylvania 3

Tangled

Zootopia

Big Hero 6

Cloudy with a Chance of Meathballs

Cloudy with a Chance of Meathballs 2

Kung Fu Panda

Kung Fu Panda 3

Horton Hears a Who!

Happy Feet

Happy Feet Two

Ben 10: Ultimate Alien

Finding Nemo

Valiant

Ratatouille

A Christmas Carol (2009)

Cars

Cars 2

Monsters, Inc.

Monsters University

Corpse Bride

The Nightmare Before Christmas

Toy Story

Toy Story 2

Toy Story 3

The Angry Birds Movie

Storks

Moana (movie)

A Monster in Paris

TMNT (film)

Batman & Mr. Freeze: SubZero

How to Train Your Dragons

How to Train Your Dragons 2

Megamind

The Incredibles

Ice Age

Ice Age: The Meltdown

Ice Age: Dawn of the Dinosaurs

Ice Age: Continental Drift

Ice Age: Collision Course

The Ice Age Adventures of Buck Wild

Outstanding Glory voice actors 
 Mehrdad Raissi
 Mohammad Reza Alimardani
 Mohammad Reza Solati
 Arezo Afari
 Hamed Azizi
 Amin Ghazi
 Majid Habibi
 Mahdi Sanikhani
 Mina Momeni
 Vahid Ronaghi
 Neda Asemani
 Rahbar Nourbakhsh
 Ali bagherli
 Tina Hashemi
 Alireza Taheri
 Sanaz Gholami
 Sara Jamei
 Ehsan Mahdi
 Hooman Khaiyat
 Hooman Haji Abdollahi
 Nima Raissi
 Sahar Chobdar
 Mahdi Baghaeiyan
 Majid Aghakarimi
 Ashkan Sadeghi
 Ebrahim Shafiei
 Keivan Asgari
 Mohammad Motazedi

References

External links
Official website

Entertainment companies of Iran
2005 establishments in Iran
Dubbing (filmmaking)